Sertaneja and Sertanejo are Brazilian terms that may refer to:
Sertanejo, a resident of the Sertão (equivalent to a United States cowboy in frontier times) 
Sertaneja, Paraná, a municipality in Paraná, Brazil
Sertanejo music, a musical genre in Brazil (known as Sertanejo)
O sertanejo, a novel by the Brazilian writer José de Alencar
Viola Sertaneja, a stringed musical instrument from North-eastern Brazil
Sertanejo, nickname of Felipe Arantes, Brazilian mixed martial artist